Fulcaldea is a genus of flowering plants in the daisy family.

Species
There is only one accepted species, Fulcaldea laurifolia, native to Peru and Ecuador.

formerly included
Fulcaldea stuessyi Roque & V.A.Funk   synonym of Eremosis tomentosa (La Llave & Lex.) Gleason

References

Barnadesioideae
Monotypic Asteraceae genera
Flora of South America
Taxa named by Aimé Bonpland